The 2019–20 season is Bristol Bears's 2nd consecutive season in the Premiership Rugby. Along with competing in the Premiership, the club will also participate in the European Challenge Cup and Premiership Rugby Shield.

Squad

Transfers

Players In
 Nathan Hughes from  Wasps
 Dave Attwood from  Bath
 Sam Bedlow promoted from Academy
 John Hawkins promoted from Academy
 Toby Fricker from  Ebbw Vale
 Jordan Lay returned from  Ospreys
 Nicky Thomas from  Scarlets
 Tyrese Johnson-Fisher from  Coastal Carolina Chanticleers
 Max Lahiff from  Bath
 Henry Purdy from  Coventry
 Adrian Choat from  Auckland (short-term loan)
 Bryan Byrne from  Leinster (short-term loan)

Players out
 Nick Haining to  Edinburgh
 Jack Tovey to  Ealing Trailfinders
 Reiss Cullen to  Doncaster Knights
 George Smith retired
 Nick Fenton-Wells retired
 Joe Latta to  Suntory Sungoliath/ Otago
 Tusi Pisi to  Toyota Industries Shuttles
 Ehize Ehizode to  Chinnor
 Sione Faletau to  Yorkshire Carnegie
 Tom Pincus to  Melbourne Rebels
 Jack Lam released
 Tyrese Johnson-Fisher released
 Sam Jeffries Sabbatical

The Following transfers were made ahead of the 2020–21 season, however due to COVID-19, there was a break in the season and the following transfers came into effect before the season restarted.

Players In
 Semi Radradra from  Bordeaux
 Kyle Sinckler from  Harlequins
 Mitch Eadie from  Northampton Saints
 Ben Earl from  Saracens (season-long loan)
 Max Malins from  Saracens (season-long loan)
 Chris Cook from  Bath
 Ratu Naulago from  Hull FC
 Will Capon promoted from Academy
 James Dun promoted from Academy
 Charlie Powell promoted from Academy
 Bryan Byrne from  Leinster

Players Out
 Jordan Crane retired
 Aly Muldowney retired
 Mat Protheroe to  Ospreys
 Nicky Thomas to  Ospreys
 Ian Madigan to  Ulster
 Nic Stirzaker to  Montauban
 Joe Batley to  Worcester Warriors
 Tom Lindsay retired
 Adrian Choat released
 Ryan Edwards released
 James Lay released
 Jordan Lay released
 Luke Daniels to  Ealing Trailfinders
 Ollie Dawe to  Jersey Reds
 Lewis Thiede to  Ealing Trailfinders
 Sam Graham to  Doncaster Knights
 Shaun Malton to  Ealing Trailfinders
 Luke Hamilton to  Oyonnax

References

Bristol Bears